For You is the fifteenth studio album by Russian pop-singer Philipp Kirkorov, released in 2007.

Track listing

Singles 
 "Ya Etu Zizn` Tebye Otdam"
 "Holodno V Gorode" (duet with Alla Pugacheva)
 "Obichnaya Istoria"
 "Serdce V 1000 Svechey"

2007 albums
Philipp Kirkorov albums